The 84th Infantry Division (84-ya Pekhotnaya Diviziya) was an infantry formation of the Russian Imperial Army.  It was organized at Perm in the Kazan Military District on the basis of hidden frame elements from the 49th Infantry Division.

Organization
1st Brigade
333rd Glazov Infantry Regiment
334th Irbitsk Infantry Regiment
2nd Brigade
335th Anapa Infantry Regiment
336th Chelyabinsk Infantry Regiment
Artillery and Sappers
84th Field Artillery Brigade
22nd Separate Sapper Company

References
Deyo, Daniel C. Legions of the East: A Compendium of the Russian Army in the First World War, Counterintelligence Consulting LLC, 2016

Infantry divisions of the Russian Empire